The Pawnee Warrior was an American helicopter that was designed and produced by Pawnee Aviation of Longmont, Colorado. Now out of production, when it was available the aircraft was supplied as a kit for amateur construction.

Design and development
The Warrior was designed to comply with the US Experimental - Amateur-built aircraft rules. It featured a single  diameter two-bladed main rotor, a two-bladed tail rotor, both made from single metal extrusions. The kit's drive components were intended to be supplied complete and ready to install. The aircraft had a single-seat open cockpit without a windshield and skid-type landing gear. A cockpit enclosure was optional. The standard engine used was a twin cylinder, air-cooled, two-stroke, dual-ignition  Hirth 2706 powerplant.

The aircraft fuselage was made from steel and aluminum tubing and supplied in three major bolt-together sub-assemblies.

The manufacturer estimated the construction time from the planned assembly kit as 80 hours.

The company said "the Warrior was used [as] a proof of concept platform to develop new models" and was followed by the two place Pawnee Chief.

Operational history
By 1998 the company reported that one aircraft had been completed and was flying.

By April 2015 no examples were registered in the United States with the Federal Aviation Administration and it is likely that no examples exist any more.

Specifications (Warrior)

See also
List of rotorcraft

References

Warrior
1990s United States sport aircraft
1990s United States helicopters
Homebuilt aircraft
Single-engined piston helicopters